Eremophila alatisepala is a plant in the figwort family, Scrophulariaceae and is endemic to the south-west of Queensland in Australia. It is a very sticky shrub covered with many glandular hairs which produce a resin that often obscures the hairs that produce it. The plant is usually found in stony places on ridges and slopes in the Queensland Channel Country.

Description

There are 5 green or yellowish sepals which are of different sizes and are usually more brightly coloured than the petals. The three upper sepals are longer and wider, curve outwards and have wings which partly cover the sides of the flower stalk. The tube is cream-coloured but pink or dark orange on the top and the inner surface of the petal lobes and the inside of the tube have darker spots. There are four stamens which are about the same length as or slightly longer than the tube.

Taxonomy and naming
The species was first formally described by Robert Chinnock in 1979 and the description was published in the Journal of the Adelaide Botanic Garden. Chinnock derived the specific epithet (alatisepala) from the Latin words for "winged" and "sepal".

Distribution and habitat
This eremophila is only found in south-west Queensland where it grows in hard stony ground, often with Senna and Triodia species.

Conservation status
Eremophila alatisepala is a rare species but is currently classified as of "least concern" under the Queensland Nature Conservation Act 1992.

Use in horticulture
This eremophila is an attractive shrub with its creamy pink flowers contrasting with the shiny, dark green leaves. It can be propagated from cuttings, although they take a few months to form roots and it can be grafted onto Myoporum. It grows best in full sun in a well-drained soil and is drought tolerant but susceptible to frosts.

References

alatisepala
Flora of Queensland
Plants described in 1979
Taxa named by Robert Chinnock